Manvel Ghazaryan (born 2 May 1961) is an Armenian politician. He attended the Armenian State University of Economics. Ghazaryan served as an Independent member of the National Assembly of Armenia from 1999 to 2007.

References 

1961 births
Living people
People from Ararat Province
Independent politicians
20th-century Armenian politicians
21st-century Armenian politicians
Armenian State University of Economics alumni
Members of the National Assembly (Armenia)